Michel Abrass, BA (born 14 December 1948) is a retired church official who was Archbishop of the Melkite Greek Catholic Archeparchy of Tyre from 2014 to 2021.

Biography
Michel Abrass was born in Aleppo, Syria. In 1973 he earned a licentiate in philosophy at the Holy Spirit University of Kaslik and continued his studies in philosophy, theology, and liturgy at the Greek College in Rome. In 1980 Abrass concluded his studies in philosophy, theology and liturgy, and in 1980 obtained a licentiate in liturgy.

Abrass was ordained a priest on 11 April 1981 and is a member of the Aleppinian Basilians. He was rector of his order's minor and major seminaries. He was also professor of liturgy at the University of Kaslik.

On 17 October 2006, Pope Benedict XVI consented to the Melkite Synod choice of Abrass as Curial Bishop of Antioch and titular bishop of Abydus. On 11 November 2006 he was appointed Titular Archbishop of Myra of Greek Melkites and on 10 December 2006 was consecrated bishop by the Melkite Patriarch of Antioch, Gregory III Laham. His co-consecrators were Archeparch Isidore Battikha, BA, from Homs and Archeparch Joseph Kallas of Beirut and Byblos, SMSP. The Synod of the Melkite bishops elected him Secretary General in 2007.

On 21 June 2014, Patriarch Gregory III Laham in accordance with the Melkite Synod named him Archbishop of Tyre.

On 31 January 2021, without explanation, Pope Francis declared the see of Tyre vacant and named Elie Bechara Haddad, Archbishop of the Melkite Greek Catholic Archeparchy of Sidon, to serve as apostolic administrator.

Views
In October 2010 Abrass was a delegate to the Special Assembly of the Synod of Bishops in Rome. Discussing the question of vocations, he said that in the Middle East:

He also spoke of Christians in Iraq:

References

External links

  

1948 births
Living people
Syrian archbishops
Melkite Greek Catholic bishops
Syrian Melkite Greek Catholics
People from Aleppo